Marco L. Sørensen (born 6 September 1990) is a Danish racing driver currently racing for Aston Martin Racing as a factory driver in the FIA World Endurance Championship. He was part of the Renault Driver Development. He has competed in such series as Eurocup Formula Renault 2.0, ADAC Formel Masters and the British Formula Ford Championship. His younger brother, Lasse, is also a racing driver and currently competes in the NASCAR Whelen Euro Series.

Career

Sørensen made his debut in karting back in 1994 and had his first real race in 1998. He began Formula racing in 2006 with Formula Ford Denmark. In 2008 was he able to place fourth in the ADAC Formel Masters despite only completing half of the season.

Sørensen was taken under Renault's wing and became a part of the 2009 Renault Driver Development Programme with Davide Valsecchi and Charles Pic. That made him able to move up to Formula Renault in 2009 with Formula Renault 2.0 Northern European Cup and the Eurocup. Later that year, the programme was shut down because of financial problems which set Sørensen's career back.

In the middle of 2010 Sørensen was able to secure a drive in the German Formula Three series, with Brandl Motorsport. He continued in 2011 and finished runner-up in the series after a tough battle with eventual champion Richie Stanaway. He also had one-off entry at Silverstone in 2011 Formula 3 Euro Series with Mücke Motorsport, winning the reverse-grid race.

Sørensen had no plans for 2012 until Lotus called him and offered a test in the Formula Renault 3.5, in which he impressed sufficiently to be offered a seat alongside former title rival Stanaway at the team.

He took his first win in the Formula Renault 3.5 Series at the first race at Spa, having already retired from a commanding position due technical problems in the second race at Aragon. Another potential win slipped from Sørensen's grasp at the second race at Silverstone, suffering a puncture whilst leading comfortably on the final lap. After two more second-place finishes, he finished the season in joint fifth position with Nick Yelloly.
Sørensen had another disaster season with engine problems in 2013 Formula Renault 3.5, but managed to take pole and victory in both races at Red Bull Ring.

GP2 Series
In 2014, Sørensen switched to GP2, replacing Tio Ellinas at MP Motorsport for the races at Silverstone and beyond. That same year, he took his first GP2 win in Sochi.

He switched to Carlin, replacing the Sauber-bound Felipe Nasr, for the 2015 season, his first full season in GP2.

Formula One
In September 2013, Sørensen undertook a tyre test at Circuit Paul Ricard with the Lotus F1 team and has become one of Lotus's test drivers.

FIA World Endurance Championship

In 2015 Sørensen joined Aston Martin Racing alongside Nicki Thiim and Christoffer Nygaard. He also became a full-time factory driver for Aston Martin. He continued with Nicki Thiim after 2015 where Aston Martin Racing cut one of their GTE Pro cars out of the series. Sørensen took his first endurance win in Austin with Thiim in 2016, and the pair would go on to win the GT Championship. As the #95 entry has mostly been driven by Sørensen and Thiim, it has come to be known as the Dane Train.

On January 19, 2022, TF Sport announced that Sørensen would make a full-season return to the World Endurance championship in 2022, piloting the #33 Aston Martin Vantage AMR alongside Ben Keating and Florian Latorre.

Racing record

Career summary

† As Sørensen was a guest driver, he was ineligible to score points.

Complete Formula Renault 3.5 Series results
(key) (Races in bold indicate pole position) (Races in italics indicate fastest lap)

Complete GP2 Series results
(key) (Races in bold indicate pole position) (Races in italics indicate fastest lap)

Complete FIA World Endurance Championship results

Complete 24 Hours of Le Mans results

‡13th in LMP2. Fourth in LMP2 Pro-Am.

Complete IMSA SportsCar Championship results
(key) (Races in bold indicate pole position; results in italics indicate fastest lap)

* Season still in progress.

Complete British GT Championship results
(key) (Races in bold indicate pole position) (Races in italics indicate fastest lap)

† As Sørensen was a guest driver, he was ineligible to score points.

Complete European Le Mans Series results
(key) (Races in bold indicate pole position; results in italics indicate fastest lap)

References

External links

 
 
 

1990 births
Living people
Sportspeople from Aalborg
Danish racing drivers
Formula Ford drivers
Portuguese Formula Renault 2.0 drivers
Formula Renault Eurocup drivers
Formula Renault 2.0 NEC drivers
24 Hours of Le Mans drivers
ADAC Formel Masters drivers
German Formula Three Championship drivers
World Series Formula V8 3.5 drivers
GP2 Series drivers
FIA World Endurance Championship drivers
British GT Championship drivers
MP Motorsport drivers
Carlin racing drivers
European Le Mans Series drivers
WeatherTech SportsCar Championship drivers
Aston Martin Racing drivers
Ma-con Motorsport drivers
Fluid Motorsport Development drivers
Motopark Academy drivers
Mücke Motorsport drivers
Charouz Racing System drivers
Tech 1 Racing drivers
Corvette Racing drivers
Nürburgring 24 Hours drivers